Betadevario ramachandrani is a species of cyprinid fish that is found only in the upper Seetha River drainage in Karnataka, India. It is the only member of its genus, Betadevario. It was found in cascade and riffle-pools of a high-altitude stream.

References

Danios
Monotypic fish genera
Fish of Asia
Fish of India
Fish described in 2010